Stanley Ronald Basford,  (April 22, 1932 – January 31, 2005) was a Canadian politician and lawyer who was a long-time Canadian Cabinet minister in the Liberal government of Pierre Trudeau. Based in British Columbia, he was known as "Mr. Granville Island" for his support of the Granville Island redevelopment project in Vancouver.

Basford earned his law degree from the University of British Columbia in 1956 and was first elected to the House of Commons of Canada in the 1963 Canadian federal election as a member of the Liberal Party of Canada, representing the district of Vancouver Centre. After winning reelection in 1968, he held several cabinet positions over the next decade under Prime Minister Pierre Trudeau, including Minister of National Revenue from 1974 to 1975 and Minister of Justice and Attorney General from 1975 until his retirement from the Cabinet in 1978. He did not seek reelection in the 1979 Canadian federal election and resumed his law career.

Early life and education
Born in Winnipeg, Manitoba Basford moved with his mother to Comox, British Columbia, following the death of his father, where he completed his last three years of high school. He then attended the University of British Columbia, earning a law degree in 1956. Following his period of Articles, he was admitted to the Bar, and practised law for the next six years.

Basford had become interested in politics in his early teenage years and was very active in the Liberal Party while at university. He was nominated as the Liberal candidate in Vancouver Burrard in March, 1962, and contested the election in June of that year, at the age of 29, losing by 94 votes.

Political career
Basford was first elected to the House of Commons of Canada as the Liberal Member of Parliament for Vancouver—Burrard in the 1963 election and was re-elected in the 1965 election. From 1968 to 1979, he represented the riding of Vancouver Centre.

In 1968, Trudeau brought Basford into cabinet as Minister of Consumer and Corporate Affairs. He subsequently served as Minister of State for Urban Affairs (1972–1974), Minister of National Revenue (1974–1975) and Minister of Justice and Attorney General of Canada (1975–1978).

As Vancouver's leading cabinet minister, Basford is credited with helping to scuttle plans for an expressway along the city's waterfront that would have levelled the Gastown and Chinatown neighbourhoods, for encouraging local planning and neighbourhood improvement, and for helping win federal support for the construction of thousands of units of co-operative housing in the city.

As Consumer and Corporate Affairs minister, Basford shepherded the passage of legislation that dramatically reduced pharmaceutical prices. This gave Canada the lowest drug prices in the industrialized world into the late 1980s when the legislation was repealed by the Mulroney government. Basford also had passed into law the Hazardous Products Act that eliminated flammable children's bedding and clothing from the market. His most controversial move, at the time, was the adoption of the SI (metric) system as Canada's official standard of weights and measures. This provoked strong opposition from many Canadians, but has since been accepted.

During his 30 months as Minister of State for Urban Affairs, Basford led the new Ministry into the uncharted waters of Federal/Provincial/Municipal consultation and cooperation through the development of Tri Level Conferences and working groups, improving the relationships among Canada's three levels of government. At the same time, he sponsored a complete revision of the National Housing Act, which initiated an era of wider programs of social housing and financial aid to municipalities through the Neighbourhood Improvement Program and the Residential Rehabilitation Assistance Program.

As Justice minister, Basford arranged a clemency agreement that kept abortion rights campaigner and practitioner Henry Morgentaler out of jail. He was also Justice minister in 1976 when Canada abolished capital punishment, and when the Canadian Human Rights Act was amended to require equal pay for equal work regardless of gender.

Basford retired from cabinet in 1978, as the longest-serving minister from BC since Confederation, and did not run in the 1979 election. He practised law with the Vancouver law firm of Davis and Company, and was named coordinator by the governments of BC and Canada of the complex Northeast Coal Development in 1982.

 Ron Basford Park at Granville Island is named after him.

Electoral history

References

External links

1932 births
2005 deaths
Liberal Party of Canada MPs
Members of the 20th Canadian Ministry
Members of the House of Commons of Canada from British Columbia
Members of the King's Privy Council for Canada
Politicians from Winnipeg
Solicitors General of Canada